Johan Christian Schønheyder (9 August 1742 – 14 April 1803) was a Danish-Norwegian priest. He was the bishop of the Diocese of Trondhjem from 1788 until 1803.

He was born in Copenhagen, Denmark in 1742 and died in 1803 in Trondheim, Norway. He graduated in theology from the University of Copenhagen in 1760, followed by studies in Germany from 1765 to 1768. He traveled with King Christian VII of Denmark as royal priest on a tour through Germany, Netherlands, United Kingdom and France from May 1768 to January 1769. In 1769 he became the pastor of Christiansborg Palace in Denmark, and then in 1771 he became the vicar of Trinity Church in Copenhagen. He kept this position until 1782 when he became a dean and parish priest of the Church of Our Lady (Vor Frue Kirke) in Copenhagen at 40 years old.  In 1788 he was appointed the bishop of the Diocese of Nidaros, which encompassed all of Northern Norway.  He held this position until his death in 1803.  He was the last Bishop over all of northern Norway, since the northernmost parts were separated to form a new diocese in 1804.

References

1742 births
1803 deaths
Clergy from Copenhagen
University of Copenhagen alumni
Bishops of Nidaros
18th-century Lutheran bishops
18th-century Norwegian clergy